Derek Poundstone (born September 28, 1981) is an American former professional strongman athlete from Woodbridge, Connecticut who placed runner-up at the 2008 World's Strongest Man. Derek Poundstone is also a police Sergeant for the Naugatuck, Connecticut Police Department and is the former owner and landlord of an apartment complex and gym.

Strength sports
Poundstone began by competing in powerlifting and progressed to become the Connecticut State Champion.  He started competing in strongman after finding an advertisement for a contest on the back of a powerlifting flyer.  After earning his Professional Strongman card from the ASC (American Strongman Corporation), Poundstone took two years off competing to enter the Police Academy and become a police officer.  He returned to compete in strongman, and placed fifth in the 2006 St. Patrick's Strongman National Qualifier.  Poundstone then went on to place 2nd to the current IFSA World Champion Žydrūnas Savickas in the 2006 World Strongman Challenge contest in Tulsa, Oklahoma. Next, Poundstone placed 5th in the 2006 America's Strongest Man contest.  This earned him an invitation to the 2006 IFSA World Championships.  On October 26, 2006, two weeks before the IFSA World Championships, Poundstone severely injured his lumbar spine during training while attempting a maximum effort deadlift of 366 kg (805 lb).  Poundstone had a lumbar disc herniation (L4/5) and a massive spinal cord hemorrhage.  Doctors told him that he would never lift again due to the severity of the injury.

Poundstone's return to the strongman competition circuit was the 2007 St. Patrick's Strongman contest in Columbia, South Carolina. Poundstone won by 13.5 points  and overcame his deadlifting injury fear by completing a 364 kg (800 lb) deadlift during the competition.  This victory qualified Poundstone to compete in the 2007 America's Strongest Man contest, which Poundstone won by a record 30 points. Poundstone also qualified to compete in the 2007 IFSA World Championships in Geumsan, South Korea. Additionally, Poundstone received an invitation from Dr. Terry Todd to compete at the 2008 Arnold Strongman Classic, in Columbus, Ohio.

Poundstone also competed in two Team Strongman contests and a Highland Games/Strongman hybrid contest.  First was the USA vs. World team contest put on by Al Thompson  in Philadelphia.  Poundstone and his team (Travis Ortmayer, Van Hatfield, Nick Best, Walt Gogola) pulled out an unprecedented victory against three of the top five European strongmen in the World, (Žydrūnas Savickas, Vasyl Virastyuk, and Andrus Murumets).  Team USA won the first three events and Team World won the next three events.  Team USA won with a victory in the final event, the Atlas Stones.  Poundstone's next contest was in Callander, Scotland at the World Highland Games contest.  This contest was a Highland Games / Strongman hybrid. Poundstone won the event and set two world records. With Douglas Edmunds present, Poundstone broke Igor Pedan's 9 rep 125 kg (275 lb) Log Clean and Press World Record  by powering through 13 reps, with 130 kg (286 lb).  Poundstone also broke the current World Champion's, Žydrūnas Savickas, 140 kg (308 lb) Block Press World Record by pressing out a 145 kg (319 lb) block.  Poundstone's training partner Tom McClure also competed in Callander and placed 2nd.  Poundstone's next contest was a team contest, the World's Strongest Nation held in Ukraine.  This time Team USA consisted of Poundstone along with Travis Ortmayer, Tom McClure, and Brian Shaw. Team USA placed 2nd overall  behind Team Ukraine led by Vasyl Virastyuk.

Poundstone competed in the 2007 IFSA World Championship held in Geumsan, South Korea.  Poundstone was in 2nd position throughout the entire competition until the last event.  During the final event, Poundstone ripped open his hands during the Farmer's Walk event, which caused him to drop the implements.  Poundstone placed 4th overall in his first appearance at the World Championship, 2 points behind Mikhail Koklyaev and 1 point behind the 2006 World Champ Žydrūnas Savickas.  Vasyl Virastyuk won the competition, becoming the first athlete to win both the World's Strongest Man Title and the IFSA World Championships.  Poundstone's performance was the best ever recorded by an American at the IFSA World Championships.

Poundstone decided to compete on the WSM/SS circuit after sufficient political differences with IFSA.  Poundstone was called up by Odd Haugen and asked to enter as a replacement athlete into the Mohegan Sun Super Series due to Kevin Nee pulling out with a torn biceps.  Poundstone accepted and competed for the first time against Mariusz Pudzianowski. Poundstone defeated the four-time WSM champion and secured a qualification spot for the 2008 World's Strongest Man contest.

Poundstone competed in the 2008 Arnold Strongman Classic contest, his first appearance at the Arnold. Poundstone would take second place behind Žydrūnas Savickas.

On June 29, 2008, during the 2 day Fortissimus contest, Poundstone became the first American to defeat Žydrūnas Savickas.  Poundstone and Savickas were approximately 40 points ahead of all the other competitors. Poundstone was the only athlete who managed to lift the 517 lb Louis Cyr Stone and secured his victory and title at the "Mightiest Man on the Planet."

Poundstone became the 2008 Strongman Super Series champion after accumulating the most points throughout the Grand Prix.  1st at the Mohegan Sun, 2nd at Madison Square Garden, and 4th at Sweden earned Poundstone enough to take the overall title.

Poundstone competed in the 2008 World's Strongest Man competition where he and Mariusz Pudzianowski, Poland's then four-time champion would go head-to-head in the final event, the atlas stones, with Poundstone leading in points.  In the atlas stones, Poundstone gained the lead, but as he lifted the final stone, the stone slipped, falling to the ground and giving Pudzianowski his record 5th World's Strongest Man title.

Poundstone's next challenge was the 2009 Arnold Strongman Classic.  With Žydrūnas Savickas opting to take a year off, the crown was vacant. Poundstone set a new world record with 15 reps in the circus dumb bell event. Poundstone took first place overall, and became only the third man behind Mark Henry and Žydrūnas Savickas to win the Arnold Strongman Classic title since its inception in 2002.

In May 2009, Poundstone was scheduled to defend his title at the Mohegan Sun Strongman Championship hosted by Giants Live. Poundstone won five of six events, taking second on one event, and took the overall title. Poundstone also set a new world record on the max apollon's axle clean and press with 415 lbs.

Poundstone competed in the 2009 World's Strongest Man competition, which took place in Malta, being in fourth place after Brian Shaw, Mariusz Pudzianowski and Žydrūnas Savickas.

Poundstone successfully defended his title at the 2010 Arnold Strongman Classic. Leading up to the last event, the timber carry, Poundstone had a 3-point lead over 6-time champion Žydrūnas Savickas. Poundstone won the last event and the overall title for a second consecutive time, only the second man to accomplish this feat at the Arnold Strongman Classic. Žydrūnas Savickas came in second and Travis Ortmayer came in third place. During the awards ceremony, Poundstone proposed to his girlfriend on stage and she happily accepted.

Poundstone defended his title at the 2010 Mohegan Sun Strongman Championships hosted by Giants Live, winning 3 out of 6 events including the shield carry. This was Poundstone's third consecutive victory at this contest. Brian Shaw came in second and Stojan Todorchev came in third place.

Shortly before the 2010 World's Strongest Man contest, Poundstone severely tore his quad muscle and was unsure if he would be able to compete, but he decided to heal and focus on upper body training. Poundstone was able to qualify for the finals and finished in 9th place overall.

Less than 24 hours after the 2010 WSM contest, Poundstone won his 3rd America's Strongest Man title.

Poundstone is the host of a radio show titled "Poundstone Power Radio" which airs every Wednesday from 6-8pm Eastern time, on SIRIUS channel 94, XM channel 208, and on Sirius XM Radio internet radio channel 860. The first episode aired on November 3, 2010.

Personal life
Poundstone married fiancée Kristin Nelson on Saturday June 25, 2011 in Branford, Connecticut's Trinity Episcopal Church. Poundstone's training partner Louis-Philippe Jean was a groomsman at the wedding, and fellow strongman competitors Travis Ortmayer and Nick Best attended the wedding. In 2017 Derek and Kristin separated then later divorced.  Both have since remarried.

Personal records – strongman
Atlas Stone
 252 kg {555 lb to 42"} Unofficial World Record Connecticut
 239 kg {525 lb to 48"} {Arnold's Strongest Man, Columbus, Ohio}
Louis Cyr Stone
 241 kg {530 lb to 36"} World Record {Fortissimus – World Strength Challenge, Notre-Dame-Du-Rosaire, Quebec, Canada} (Louis Cyr lift it up to the top of his shoulder, Derek lift it by fliping it on a small block)
Log Press
 130 kg * 13 {286 lb} – 75 sec time limit, Clean and Press each rep} World Record Callander Games, Scotland}
Overhead Block Lift
 150 kg {330 lb} World Record {World's Strongest Man 2011, Wingate, North Carolina}
Circus Dumbbell
 {227 lb * 11 – 90 sec time limit, Clean and Press each rep} World Record {Arnold's Strongest Man, Columbus, Ohio}
Car Squat
 360 kg * 12 reps {792 lb} {World's Strongest Nation 2007, Ukraine}
Tire Deadlift
 363 kg {800 lb} {USA National Championship Qualifier, South Carolina, United States}
Hummer Tire Deadlift
 481 kg {1062 lb} {Arnold Strongman Classic 2012, Columbus, Ohio}
Timber Frame Carry
  {1000 lb – 11.59 sec on 36' incline ramp} American Record {Arnold's Strongest Man, Columbus, Ohio}
Super Yoke
 500 kg {1100 lb – 9.59 sec for 32'} {Arnold's Strongest Man, Columbus, Ohio}

Personal records – powerlifting
done in official powerlifting meets in ADAU ("Anti Drug Athletes United") as a Junior/ Teen-ager

under powerlifting rules (no wrist straps, clean lifts)

Squat

Bench press 
 196 kg {430 lb} – November, 2003
→ 20-23 yr old 319 lb class ADAU American Record

Deadlift 
 289 kg {635 lb} (June, 2003)
→ 20-23 yr old 275 lb class ADAU American Record
 311 kg {685 lb} (November, 2003)
→ 20-23 yr old 319 lb class ADAU American Record

Total 
 750 kg {1650 lb} (November, 2003)
→ 20-23 yr old 319 lb class ADAU American Record

done in official strongman competitions

under strongman rules (wrist straps, leaning back and hitching allowed)

Deadlift 
 395 kg {870 lb} no wrist wraps, with power suit from standard height (Madison Square Garden Super Series – June 21, 2008 – New York)
 415 kg {914 lb} with wrist straps from standard height (World Strongest Man 2011')
 481 kg {1062 lb} Hummer Tire Deadlift – partial deadlift with wrist straps with high bending bar (Arnold Strongman Classic 2012')

done in the gym (unofficial)

Bench Press 
 224 kg {500 lb} for 3 repetitions raw (February, 2009)
 265 kg {585 lb} raw (May, 2012) according to Poundstone himself

Deadlift
 363 kg {800 lb} for 9 repetitions with wrist straps and power suit, leaning back and hitching allowed (August, 2009)
 389 kg {855 lb} from standard height (recent gym lift personal record – October, 2007)
 413 kg {910 lb} with wrist straps from standard height (most recent gym lift personal record – 2011')

Achievements
Professional Competitive Record – [1st (6), 2nd (6), 3rd (3) – Out of Total(19)]
Performance Metric – .923  [American – .931  International – .915]
  
 Arnold Strongman Classic – Columbus, Ohio – 1st Place  (March 6–8, 2010
 America's Strongest Man (USA National Championship) Morgantown, W. Virginia – Winner – (7/24-7/26/09)
 Fortissimus – Louis Cyr Strength Challenge Montmagny, Quebec, Canada – 2nd place  (6/24-6/25/09)
 Giants Live (World's Strongest Man Qualifier) – Uncasville, Connecticut, USA – 1st Place(5/17/2009)
 Arnold Strongman Classic – Columbus, Ohio – 1st Place  (March 6–8, 2009)
 World's Strongest Man – Charleston, West Virginia, USA – 2nd Place  (September 2008)
 Sweden Super Series (World's Strongest Man Qualifier) – Sweden – 4th place (8/16/2008)
 Fortissimus – Louis Cyr World Strength Challenge – Notre-Dame-Du-Rosaire, Quebec, Canada – winner (6/28-29/2008)
 Madison Square Garden Super Series (World's Strongest Man Qualifier) – New York, USA – 2nd place (6/21/2008)
 Arnold's Strongest Man – Columbus, Ohio, USA – 2nd
 Mohegan Sun Super Series (World's Strongest Man Qualifier) – Uncasville, Connecticut, USA – winner (1/19/2008) 
 World vs. Lithuania Team Competition – Vilnius, Lithuania – 2nd (10/27/2007)
 IFSA 2-Man Team World Championship – Vilnius, Lithuania – 3rd (10/7/2007)
 IFSA World Championship – Geumsan, South Korea – 4th (2007) 
 World's Strongest Nation Team Competition – Ukraine – 2nd (2007) 
 World Highland Games – Callander, Scotland – winner (7/29/2007)
 USA vs. World Team Competition  – Philadelphia, Pennsylvania, USA – winner (2007) 
 America's Strongest Man (USA National Championship) – Charlotte, North Carolina, USA – winner (2007) 
 St. Patrick's Strongman (USA National Championship Qualifier) – Columbia, South Carolina – winner (2007)
 USA vs. Lithuania Team Competition – Lithuania – 2nd (2006) 
 World's Strongest Nation Team Competition – Kiev, Ukraine – 3rd  (2006) 
 America's Strongest Man (USA National Championship) – Charlotte, North Carolina, USA – 5th (2006) 
 World Strongman Challenge (USA Grand Prix) – Tulsa, Oklahoma, USA – 2nd (5/19/2006) 
 St. Patrick's Strongman (USA National Championship Qualifier) – Columbia, South Carolina, USA – 5th (3/17/2006) 
 Florida Pro–Am – Florida, USA – 3rd (2005) 
 Northeast Regional Strongman Showdown – Wilmington, Massachusetts, USA – winner (2004) earned ASC Professional Strongman card
 Connecticut State Powerlifting Champion

References

External links
Derek Poundstone's official site
Official ASC Professional Athlete Profile of Derek Poundstone
Official YouTube web site of Derek Poundstone
Derek Poundstone - The Viper YouTube compilation, courtesy Garrick Daft
Photos from Callander Games, courtesy Jammach_UK
Derek Poundstone profile at MHPSTRONG.com

American powerlifters
American strength athletes
1981 births
Living people
American municipal police officers
Sportspeople from Waterbury, Connecticut
American landlords